In algebraic topology, the pushforward of a continuous function  :  between two topological spaces is a homomorphism   between the homology groups for .

Homology is a functor which converts a topological space  into a sequence of homology groups . (Often, the collection of all such groups is referred to using the notation ; this collection has the structure of a graded ring.) In any category, a functor must induce a corresponding morphism. The pushforward is the morphism corresponding to the homology functor.

Definition for singular and simplicial homology 

We build the pushforward homomorphism as follows (for singular or simplicial homology):

Then we extend  linearly via .

The maps  :  satisfy  where  is the boundary operator between chain groups, so  defines a chain map.

We have that  takes cycles to cycles, since  implies . Also  takes boundaries to boundaries since .

Properties and homotopy invariance 

Two basic properties of the push-forward are:

  for the composition of maps .

A main result about the push-forward is the homotopy invariance: if two maps  are homotopic, then they induce the same homomorphism .

This immediately implies that the homology groups of homotopy equivalent spaces are isomorphic:

The maps  induced by a homotopy equivalence  are isomorphisms for all .

References
 Allen Hatcher, Algebraic topology. Cambridge University Press,  and 

Topology
Homology theory